Szegedi VSE Stadion is a sports stadium in Szeged, Hungary. The stadium is home to the famous association football side Szeged 2011. The stadium has a capacity of 5,000.

Attendance

Records
Record Attendance:
 10,000 Szegedi EOL AK v Rába ETO, April 21, 1984

External links 
Magyarfutball.hu 

Football venues in Hungary
Sport in Szeged
SZEOL SC